Kovel (/ קאוולי ) is a city in Volyn Oblast (province), in northwestern Ukraine. It serves as the administrative center of Kovel Raion (district). Population: 

Kovel gives its name to one of the oldest runic inscriptions which were lost during World War II. The Kovel spearhead, unearthed near the town in 1858, contained text in Gothic.

History
The name Kovel comes from a Slavonic word for blacksmith hence the horseshoe on the town's coat of arms. The rune-inscribed Spearhead of Kovel was found near Kovel in 1858. It dates to the early 3rd century, when Gothic tribes lived in the area.

Kovel (Kowel) was first mentioned in 1310. It received its town charter from the Polish King Sigismund I the Old in 1518. In 1547 the owner of Kowel became Bona Sforza, Polish queen. In 1564 starost of Kowel became Kurbski (d. 1584). From 1566 to 1795 it was part of the Volhynian Voivodeship. Kowel was a royal city of Poland.

After the late 18th century Partitions of Poland the town fell into the Russian Empire for over a hundred years. During the First World War, the city was a site of the Battle of Kovel between the Central Powers and the Russian Empire. In the interwar period, Kovel served as the capital of Kovel County in Volhynian Voivodeship of the Polish Republic. It was an important garrison of the Polish Army, here the headquarters of the 27th Volhynian Infantry Division was located. Furthermore, at the village of Czerkasy, a large depot of the Polish Army was located. In 1924, construction of the St. Stanislaus Bishop and Martyr Roman Catholic church began.

In World War II, following the Nazi German invasion of Poland and the Soviet invasion of Poland in 1939, Kovel had a large number of Jewish refugees from Nazi occupied Poland. The area had a large presence of the Communist Party of Western Ukraine, and thus the Red Army was generally greeted as liberators. Subsequently, in 1941 Operation Barbarossa the Germans having conquered the town on 28 June 1941 murdered 18,000 Jews in Kovel, mostly during August and September 1942.

About 8,000 Jews were murdered in the forest near Bakhiv on 19 August 1942 during the liquidation of the Kovel ghetto, established on 25 May 1942. Jewish victims were driven by train from Kovel to Bakhiv where pits were dug close to the railroads. Actually there were two ghettos, one within the city and another in the suburbs of Pyaski. Both ghettos had 24,000 Jews, including many refugees. The Jews from both ghettos were executed at different places and at different time. The Jewish community ceased to exist.

In March and April 1944 during the Soviet Polesskoe offensive, Kovel was a site of fierce fighting between the 5th SS Panzer Division Wiking and the Red Army.

During the Volhynian Genocide, the town was a shelter for ethnic Poles, escaping the genocide. In that period, Ukrainian nationalists murdered app. 3,700 Polish inhabitants of Kovel county. In early spring of 1944, the 27th Infantry Division of the Home Army operated in the area. Kovel was captured by the Red Army on 6 July 1944. In 1945, the Big Three, Great Britain, the United States and the Soviet Union, established new borders for Poland; the Polish population was forcibly resettled and Kovel was incorporated into the Ukrainian Soviet Socialist Republic. It has been a part of sovereign Ukraine since 1991.

Climate

Transportation

Kovel is the north-western hub of the Ukrainian rail system, with six rail lines radiating outward from the city.  The first of these was built in 1873, connecting the city with Brest-Litovsk and Rivne. In 1877 Kovel was linked by the Vistula River Railroad with Lublin and Warsaw in Congress Poland.

Notable people
 Serhiy Chapko (born 1988), former professional footballer
 Lesya Ukrainka (1871–1913), Ukrainian poet 
 Abraham Zapruder (1905–1970), clothing manufacturer who filmed the Assassination of John F. Kennedy 
 Meir Auerbach (1815–1877), first Ashkenazi Chief Rabbi of Jerusalem.
 Israel Friedlander, rabbi, educator and biblical scholar
 Frieda Hennock, first female commissioner of the Federal Communications Commission
 Kazimierz Dejmek (1924–2002), Polish actor, theatre and film director 
 Michał Waszyński (1904–1965), Polish (later American) film producer  
 Ryszard Horodecki (born 1943), Polish physicist, professor of University of Gdańsk

Twin towns – sister cities

Kovel is twinned with:

 Baboszewo, Poland
 Barsinghausen, Germany
 Brzeg Dolny, Poland
 Bucha, Ukraine
 Chamblee, United States
 Chełm, Poland
 Łęczna, Poland
 Legionowo, Poland
 Nikolske, Ukraine
 Shchuchyn, Belarus
 Smila, Ukraine
 Szczuczyn, Poland
 Utena, Lithuania
 Walsrode, Germany

References

External links

 Kovel News 
 Short history of Kowel 
  Carrier "Kowel" leased by Poland during World War II
 Tineke Looijenga,  Texts & contexts of the oldest Runic inscriptions Published by BRILL. Page 127
  A Testament of a Jewish Woman from Kowel, Poland Source: Safira Rapoport (Ed.), Yesterdays and then Tomorrows, Yad Vashem 2002, p. 183 (in the Hebrew edition).
 David Pentland, "Fight for Kowel, Poland, March/April 1944", Gerhard Fischer Knights Cross signature series
 Historic images of Kovel
 Soviet topographic map 1:100 000
 Photos of Kovel at "Ukraine Photos"
 http://www.shtetlinks.jewishgen.org/kovel/kovel.htm
 http://www.israeli-kovel-org.org/english.html

 
Cities in Volyn Oblast
Volhynian Voivodeship (1569–1795)
Kovelsky Uyezd
Wołyń Voivodeship (1921–1939)
Shtetls
Cities of regional significance in Ukraine
Holocaust locations in Ukraine